Robert Lechte (born August 3, 1978) is a Swedish handballer, currently the goalkeeper of Danish Handball League side Aarhus GF. He joined the club in 2006, having previously played for IFK Skövde in the top division of Sweden.

Lechte has made 7 appearances for the Swedish national handball team.

External links
 Player info

1978 births
Living people
Swedish male handball players